Samuel Klein may refer to:
 Samuel Klein (businessman) (1923–2014), founder of the Casas Bahia chain of stores in Brazil
 Samuel Klein (doctor), doctor and nutritional expert based at Washington University
 Samuel Klein (scholar) (1886–1940), historian and geography researcher of the Land of Israel
 Samuel Klein (1886–1942), founder of S. Klein department stores
 Sam Klein (soccer), Australian footballer
 Sam Klein, lead character in the Allan Levine series by the same name